City Museum is a museum located in Hyderabad, India situated in the palace Purani Haveli.

History
The museum was inaugurated on 11 March 2012 by  Nizam's Jubilee Pavilion Trust chairman, Prince Muffakham Jah, the grandson of the last ruler of Hyderabad state Mir Osman Ali Khan.

The Museum
The museum houses neolithic pots, megalithic sites, European styled terracotta figurines, coins of Satvahana period among others.

References

City museums
Art museums and galleries in India
Museums in Hyderabad, India
Museums in Telangana
Museums established in 2012
2012 establishments in Andhra Pradesh
Archaeological museums in India